Stone Cold Ohio is the fifth album by Little Axe, released on August 14, 2006 by Real World Records and Virgin Records.

Track listing

Personnel 

Musicians
Will Calhoun – drums and percussion (3, 14)
Madeline Edgehill – backing vocals
Paget King – keyboards (1, 4, 5, 8)
Ghetto Priest – backing vocals (1, 4, 5, 8, 12)
Keith LeBlanc – drum programming (1, 4, 5, 7, 8, 11)
Skip McDonald – vocals, guitar, producer
Carlton "Bubblers" Ogilvie – backing vocals
Denise Sherwood – backing vocals
Valerie Skeete – backing vocals
Doug Wimbish – bass guitar (1-5, 8, 9, 11, 12, 14), engineering

Technical personnel
Nick Coplowe – engineering, mixing, drum programming (2, 3, 6, 9, 10, 12-15)
Jim Dobson – engineering
Axel Hirn – engineering
Kevin Metcalfe – mastering
Eric Renwart – engineering
Adrian Sherwood – producer

Release history

References

External links 
 

2006 albums
Albums produced by Adrian Sherwood
Little Axe albums